Walid Abd-Rabo Al-Jahdali (born 1 June 1982) is a former Saudi Arabian footballer who played as a defender. He started his career with Al-Ahli and started in four of their 2005 AFC Champions League matches, before leading the Jeddah-based side to the Crown Prince Cup and the Saudi Federation Cup that same season.

Walid made several appearances for the Saudi Arabia national football team, including five FIFA World Cup qualifying matches. He also represented Saudi Arabia at the 2007 AFC Asian Cup.

References

External links

1982 births
Living people
Association football defenders
Sportspeople from Jeddah
Saudi Arabian footballers
Saudi Arabia international footballers
2007 AFC Asian Cup players
Al-Ahli Saudi FC players
Al-Shabab FC (Riyadh) players
Al-Orobah FC players
Saudi Professional League players